Keisham Reagan Singh (born 1 April 1991) is an Indian professional footballer who plays as a defender for Hyderabad, on loan from Indian Super League club Chennaiyin.

Career

Royal Wahingdoh
Reagan Singh started his senior career at Royal Wahingdoh 2012 and was part of their time in the I-League 2nd Division from the same year and participated in the Shillong Premier League in 2012, 2013, and 2014 for Royal Wahingdoh. He even played for the side in the I-League 2nd Division.

He started his first game since Royal Wahingdoh's promotion to the I-League on 28 December 2014 in the Federation Cup against Mumbai. Breaking onto the scene with newly promoted side Royal Wahingdoh FC in the 2015 edition of the I-League, his no nonsense defending was essential in helping the team finish third in the league. This also saw him rewarded with a callup to the India for the World Cup Qualifiers.

NorthEast United (loan)
In July 2015, Reagan was drafted to play for NorthEast United in the 2015 Indian Super League.

Salgaocar
On 7 January 2016, Salgaocar confirmed that they have signed Royal Wahingdoh's star side back Reagan singh for 1 year. On 28 January, Reagan made his I-league debut against Shillong Lajong

NorthEast United
In July 2016, Regan signed on a permanent basis for NorthEast United.

Mumbai FC
In January 2017, Reagan signed with Mumbai FC for 2016-17 I-League season on loan.

Chennaiyin FC
In September 2020, Reagan signed a one-year deal with Chennaiyin FC.

Career statistics

Club

External links
Official Facebook
Indian SuperLeague Profile

References

1991 births
Living people
Indian footballers
Royal Wahingdoh FC players
NorthEast United FC players
Salgaocar FC players
Association football defenders
Footballers from Manipur
I-League 2nd Division players
I-League players
Indian Super League players
Mumbai FC players
Chennaiyin FC players
Hyderabad FC players